Syracuse FC is a soccer team based in Syracuse, New York. They debuted in the National Premier Soccer League in May 2017. The team colors are white, black, gold and maroon.

History 

Syracuse FC was announced as a National Premier Soccer League expansion team on February 8, 2017. On the day of the announcement, the leadership group was announced with former professional player and college men's soccer coach Jaro Zawislan serving as President and Matt Tantalo acting as both General Manager and the inaugural Head Coach. Former Major Indoor Soccer League goalkeeper Joe Papaleo would also serve as the team's Vice President and head of soccer operations.

The team played its inaugural match on May 20, 2017, at home in Onondaga Community College's David W. Murphy Field (now known as Chuck Wilbur Field) against defending NPSL National Champions AFC Cleveland. Forward Slavisa Ubiparipovic scored the first goal in team history via a penalty kick to tie the game in the 33rd minute, but Syracuse went on to drop the match, 5-1, in front of 2000 fans.

In March 2020, Syracuse was announced as an expansion side in the United Premier Soccer League, a national amateur league, with plans to begin play in the Northeast Conference's Western N.Y. Division for the 2020 Spring Season.

Staff

Players

2017 Roster
Roster is correct as of May 16, 2017

Year-by-year

References 

Association football clubs established in 2017
Men's soccer clubs in New York (state)
National Premier Soccer League teams
United Premier Soccer League teams
2017 establishments in New York (state)